Anarosaurus is an extinct genus of pachypleurosaurs that lived in the Middle Triassic period (Anisian) and has been found in the Jena Formation and the Karlstadt Formation of Germany and the Winterswijk Quarry (Lower Muschelkalk) of The Netherlands. Two species are known: A. pumilio (the type species) and A. heterodontus. The holotype of A. pumilio was originally housed at the Institut und Museum fur Geologie und Palaontologie, Georg-August-Universitat, Gottingen, but can no longer be located today because it was lost or destroyed during World War II.

See also
 List of plesiosaurs

References

Triassic plesiosaurs
Extinct animals of Europe
Anisian life
Sauropterygian genera